The London and North Eastern Railway (LNER) D49 Class is a class of 4-4-0 steam locomotives designed by Nigel Gresley.  They were named after fox hunts and shires.

One, 246/62712 Morayshire has been preserved on the Bo'ness and Kinneil Railway.

Sub-classes
 D49/1 Introduced 1927 with Walschaerts and, Gresley conjugated valve gear with  piston valves
 D49/2 Introduced 1928 with Lentz rotary-cam poppet valves
 D49/3 Introduced 1928 with Lentz oscillating-cam poppet valves
 D class Introduced 1941 with Stephenson valve Gear and 8-inch(203 mm) piston valves

Names and numbers

Accidents and incidents
On 3 January 1931, locomotive No. 2758 Northumberland was hauling a passenger train that was derailed at Carlisle, Cumberland due to excessive speed through a curve. Three people were killed.
On August 16, 1952, the single D class locomotive No. 62768 The Morpeth was involved in a collision between a light engine and a passenger train at Dragon Junction near Starbeck. The other two locomotives involved were also Ex-LNER D49's. No.62758 The Cattistock and the other D49 were repaired after the accident but The Morpeth sustained substantial damage and was withdrawn and scrapped that same year. The Cattistock’s tender was damaged, so it and The Morpeth’s undamaged tender were swapped.

Images

References

External links 

 D49 Hunt/Shire page on the LNER Encyclopedia
 D49 No. 62719 Peebles-shire in 1953 on YouTube

4-4-0 locomotives
D49
Preserved London and North Eastern Railway steam locomotives
Railway locomotives introduced in 1927
Standard gauge steam locomotives of Great Britain
Passenger locomotives